Paul Vincent Kelly (born 1947) is a United States Marine who served as Assistant Secretary of State for Legislative Affairs from 2001 through 2005.

Biography
Paul V. Kelly was born in 1947 and was educated at Merrimack College, from which he received a bachelor's degree and the Lowell Technological Institute, receiving a master's degree.

Kelly served thirty years in the United States Marine Corps. In 1988, he became the Marine Corps' liaison to the United States Senate Appropriations Subcommittee on Defense. He became Director of the Marine Corps War College in 1994, holding that position until 1997 when he became President of the United States Department of the Navy's Physical Evaluation Board.

In April 2001, President of the United States George W. Bush nominated Col. Kelly as Assistant Secretary of State for Legislative Affairs and he subsequently held this office from June 1, 2001 until January 24, 2005.

References
Press Release Announcing President Bush's Nomination of Kelly as Assistant Secretary of State for Legislative Affairs

1947 births
Living people
United States Assistant Secretaries of State
Merrimack College alumni
United States Marine Corps colonels
Lowell Technological Institute alumni